Gilat Levy is an economist, researcher and council member. She has previously worked as a lecturer at Tel Aviv University at the Berglas School of Economics. Levy also held a role at Princeton as a Visiting Fellow prior to her arrival at the London School of Economics in 2008 as a full-time professor.

Education 
She studied economics at the Tel Aviv University where she attained her BA in economics in 1992. Levy earned her Doctor of Philosophy (PhD) degree in economics at Princeton University in 1999.

Career 
Levy has been a professor of economics at the London School of Economics since 2008, specializing in microeconomic theory, political economy and law & economics. Levy is a full-time professor teaching graduate courses focusing on public policy and also teaching undergraduate courses in mathematical economics and advanced microeconomic theory. Levy previously held the role of deputy-head for teaching at the economics department at the London School of Economics from 2013–2016. Currently, she is an active member of the graduate admissions committee. She is also a council member for the European Economic Association. Her main field of study is Business and Administration.

Levy is currently a research fellow with the Centre for Economic Policy Research and is a member of the Board of Managing Editors for the Royal Economic Society's The Economic Journal.

Select bibliography 

 "It takes two : an explanation of the democratic peace," LSE Research Online Documents on Economics 539, London School of Economics and Political Science, LSE Library. 2004, with Ronny Razin.
 “Careerist Judges and the Appeals Process.” The RAND Journal of Economics, vol. 36, no. 2, 2005, pp. 275–297.
 
 “Decision Making in Committees: Transparency, Reputation, and Voting Rules.” The American Economic Review, vol. 97, no. 1, 2007, pp. 150–168.

Blog posts and press citations 
Levy is currently a Joint Managing Editor for the Economic Journal. She has been part of the board of editors for the American Economic Review. She was an Associate Editor for Theoretical Economics. She was also previously apart of the Editorial Board for the Review of Economic Studies.

Awards 
ESRC has awarded Levy with several research awards towards her work. She is a fellow of the European Economic Association and the Econometric Society.

References

External links
 

Academics of the London School of Economics
Israeli economists
Israeli women economists
Living people
Place of birth missing (living people)
Princeton University alumni
Tel Aviv University alumni
Fellows of the Econometric Society
Year of birth missing (living people)
Fellows of the European Economic Association